Barbara Sosgórnik (born 15 July 1934) is a Polish hurdler. She competed in the women's 80 metres hurdles at the 1960 Summer Olympics.

References

External links
 

1934 births
Living people
Athletes (track and field) at the 1960 Summer Olympics
Polish female hurdlers
Olympic athletes of Poland
Place of birth missing (living people)